In the United States armed services, a military cadence or cadence call is a traditional call-and-response work song sung by military personnel while running or marching. In the United States, these cadences are sometimes called jody calls or jodies, after Jody, a recurring character who figures in some traditional cadences; Jody refers to the person with whom a servicemember’s significant other cheats while they are deployed.

Requiring no instruments to play, they are counterparts in oral military folklore of the military march. As a sort of work song, military cadences take their rhythms from the work being done (compare sea shanty). Many cadences have a call and response structure in which one servicemember initiates a line, and the remaining SMs complete it, thus instilling teamwork and camaraderie for completion. The cadence calls move to the beat and rhythm of the normal speed (quick time) march or running-in-formation (double time) march. This serves the purpose of keeping SMs "dressed", moving in step as a unit and in formation, while maintaining the correct beat or cadence.

On top of the psychological effects that cadences produce, they also produce significant physiological effects. Singing a cadence while running or marching helps SMs keep their heads up, take deeper breaths and exhale more forcefully. This increases oxygen to the lungs and gives the body more energy. This in turn makes the unit healthier and better prepared.

The word "cadence" was applied to these work songs because of an earlier meaning, in which it meant the number of steps a marcher or runner took per minute. The cadence was set by a drummer or Sergeant and discipline was extremely important, as keeping the cadence directly affected the travel speed of infantry. There were other purposes: the close-order drill was a particular cadence count for the complex sequence of loading and firing a musket. In the Revolutionary War, Baron von Steuben notably imported European battlefield techniques which persist, greatly modified, to this day.

"The Duckworth  Chant" (or "Sound Off!")
A V-Disc  issued in 1944 credits the origin of "Sound Off" ("The Duckworth Chant") to Private Willie Lee Duckworth of Sandersville, Georgia, an African American soldier serving in the United States Army.

This original cadence was recorded as "Sound Off":
Sound-off; 1 - 2; Sound-off; 3 - 4; Cadence count; 1 - 2 - 3 - 4; 1 - 2 — 3 - 4.

This cadence, known as the "Duckworth Chant," still exists with variations in the different branches of the U.S. military. Duckworth's simple chant was elaborated on by Army drill sergeants and their trainees, and the practice of creating elaborate marching chants spread to the Air Force, Marine Corps, and Navy.

A musical version of the chant was recorded by Vaughn Monroe and His Orchestra (Voc.: Vaughn Monroe & Chorus in New York City) on March 7, 1951. It was released by RCA Victor Records as catalog number 20-4113A (in USA) and by EMI on the His Master's Voice label as catalog number B 10086.

A variant of that cadence was used in the 1949 movie Battleground and in the 1981 movie Taps, filmed at Valley Forge Military Academy and College in Wayne, Pennsylvania. It appears in two versions in the film, both ending in the same cadence.

Collected cadences

Some common cadences include:

 Old King Cole
 Blood Upon the Risers
 I Wish All the Girls Were
 Satan's Raiders
 Irene Irene (Air Force cadence)
Captain Jack (Army cadence)
Yellow Ribbon (Army cadence)

As soon as 1952, the U.S. Army adopted The Army Goes Rolling Along as its service theme song, with the lyric "count off the cadence loud and strong" a reference to Duckworth's cadence. Its melody and lyrics derive from the traditional When the Caissons Go Rolling Along.

The United States Marine Corps and US Naval Academy use a modified version of the Old King Cole lyrics, referencing Chesty Puller: "Chesty Puller was a good Marine and a good Marine was he".

"Jody calls"

In the United States, what are now known as cadences were called jody calls or jody (also jodie) from a recurring character, a civilian named "Jody", whose luxurious lifestyle is contrasted with military deprivations in several traditional calls. The mythical Jody refers to a civilian who remains at home instead of joining the military service. Jody is often presumed to be medically unfit for service, a 4F  in WWII parlance. Jody also lacks the desirable attributes of military persons. They are neither brave nor squared away. Jody calls often make points with ironic humor. Jody will take advantage of a service member's significant other in the service member's absence. Jody stays at home, drives the SM’s car, and gets the SM’s sweetheart (often called "Susie") while the SM is in boot camp or in country.

An R-&-B example of the folkloric Jody character is the 1970 hit single from Johnny Taylor, "Jody's Got Your Girl and Gone". Another is the poem "Black Soldier" by the Last Poets on their 1972 album Chastisement.

The name derives from a stock character in African-American oral traditions, "Joe the Grinder". The character's name has been transcribed as "Joady", "Jody", "Jodie", "Joe D." or even "Joe the " (in dialect, "Joe de "), with Joe then identified by occupation. He was a stock villain who maliciously took advantage of another man's absence. Enlisted African-American soldiers incorporated this character into cadence songs during the Second World War.

Lineberry emphasizes conflicting uses of the calls: they are useful to command, in that they serve as instruments to psychologically detach the soldier from home-life and to inculcate a useful degree of aggression. They are useful to the soldier, who can vent dissatisfaction without taking individual responsibility for the expression. While jodies, strictly speaking, are folklore (they are not taught institutionally, and do not appear, for example, in FM 3-21.5, Drill and Ceremonies Field Manual), some are tolerated and even encouraged by leadership, while others are subversive.

Common themes in jodies include:
 Homesickness.
 Everyday complaints about military life.
 Boasts (of one's own unit) and insults (of one's competitor, which may be another unit, another service branch, or the enemy).
 Humorous and topical references.
 Loyalty.

Lineberry offers an alternative, psychologically and functionally oriented taxonomy. There are negative themes (disrespect expressed for deities, women, homosexuals, the enemy, and economically deprived comrades; graphic expression of violence perpetrated on women and the enemy, glorification of substance abuse) but also positive (unit pride, encouragement of comrades) and perhaps in-between, expressions of contempt for death and indifference to mortality.

One example used in the U.S. Army:

My honey heard me comin' on my left right on left
I saw Jody runnin' on his left right on left
I chased after Jody and I ran him down
Poor ol' boy doesn't feel good now

M.P.s came a runnin' on their left right on left
The medics came a runnin' on their left right on left
He felt a little better with a few I.V.s
Son I told you not to mess with them ELEVEN Bs (the designation for infantry in the Army)

Some from the U.S. Marine Corps:

Jody, Jody six feet four
Jody never had his ass kicked before.
I'm gonna take a three-day pass
And really slap a beating on Jody's ass!

Ain't no use in going back
Jody's got your Cadillac
Ain't no use in going home
Jody's got your girl and gone
Ain't no use in feeling blue
Jody's got your sister too!

In the first and last scenes of the 1949 movie Battleground, the cadence sung is as follows, with the call initiated by the platoon sergeant (played by James Whitmore) and the response from the rest of the platoon:
You had a good home but you left / You're right
You had a good home but you left / You're right
Jody was there when you left / You're right
Your baby was there when you left / You're right
Sound off! / 1,2
Sound off! / 3,4
Cadence count! / 1,2,3,4,1,2 ... 3,4!
<p>
They signed you up for the length of the war /
I've never had it so good before
The best you'll get in a biv-ou-ac /
Is a whiff of cologne from a passing WAC
Sound off! / 1,2
Sound off! / 3,4
Cadence count! / 1,2,3,4,1,2 ... 3,4!
<p>
There ain't no use in going back /
Jody's livin' it up in the shack
Jody's got somethin' you ain't got /
It's been so long I almost forgot
Sound off! / 1,2
Sound off! / 3,4
Cadence count! / 1,2,3,4,1,2 ... 3,4!

Your baby was lonely, as lonely could be /
Til Jody provided the company
Ain't it great to have a pal /
Who works so hard just to keep up morale
Sound off! / 1,2
Sound off! / 3,4
Cadence count! / 1,2,3,4,1,2 ... 3,4!
<p>
You ain't got nothin' to worry about /
He'll keep her happy until I get out
An' you won't get home til the end of the war /
In nineteen hundred and seventy four
Sound off! / 1,2
Sound off! / 3,4
Cadence count! / 1,2,3,4,1,2 ... 3,4!

Reverent
Reverent calls are an effort by personnel in armed forces to rebuild the tradition of oratory recounting of military history in the convention of cadences. The effect this instills is a greater reverence in the squad performing and for the force whose story is retold in honorable PT (Physical Training). Each branch of an armed force has its stories, and an example of the base used is the 75th Ranger Regiment (Infantry's "Airborne Ranger") in which references to WWII for example are included to complement the story.

Airborne
Rangers lead the way
Lead in
Airborne
Rangers lead the way
Deep in the battlefield covered in blood
Lies an Airborne Ranger dying in the mud

Airborne
Rangers lead the way
With those silver wings upon his chest
Tell America that he's one of their best

Airborne
Rangers lead the way
Lead out
Airborne
Rangers lead the way

Comedic
Comedic calls are often born of reverent calls but sung for comedic value using clean calls, pop-culture references, and jokes to make PT more fun and entertaining. A popular example from the film Stripes was "Why did the chicken cross the road?" "To get from the left to the right." "Stepped out of rank, got hit by a tank." "He ain't a chicken no more."  Prior to women being commonplace in Army ranks, sexist comedic cadences were more prevalent.

Example:
See that lady wearing brown?  She makes her livin' goin' down ... She's a deep-sea diver ... a deep sea diver
See that lady wearing black?  She makes her livin' on her back ... she's a back-stroke swimmer ... a back stroke swimmer
See that lady from the south?  She makes her living with her mouth ... she's a rock n' roll singer ... a rock n' roll singer

And so on.

Birdy, Birdy in the sky
Dropped a whitewash in my eyes
I'm no wimp, I don't cry
I'm just glad that cows don't fly

Superman was the man of steel,

but he aint no match for a Navy Seal.

Chief and Supe got in a fight;

Chief hit Supe with kryptonite.

Supe fell to his knees in pain.

Now Chief's dating Lois Lane

Well Chief and Batman had one too,

Chief hit him in the head with his shoe.

Hit him in the temple with his left heel,

Now Chief's driving the Batmobile.

Controversial
Obscene, scatological, or controversial jody calls exist, and were typical, especially during and before the Vietnam War. The use of such calls is now discouraged by the US military, which instead emphasizes "clean" versions of traditional jodies. The flexibility of jodies is nearly unlimited, and old jodies have always been revived or rewritten as times and wars change.

Your left
Your left
Your left right left
My back aches
My belts too tight
I don't know but I've been told
Eskimo pussy is mighty cold
Sound off 1, 2
Sound off 3, 4

Airborne Ranger:

Two old ladies lying in bed
One rolled over to the other and said,
"I wanna be an Airborne Ranger
Live a life of danger
Blood, guts, and danger
That's the life of an Airborne Ranger!"

I wanna be an airborne ranger
I wanna live the life of danger
Airborne Ranger
Life of Danger

An alternate from Fort Dix circa 1981. D.I. calls it out, soldiers repeat it back.

Up jumped a monkey from a coconut grove
He's a mean motherfucker you can tell by his clothes
Stand up, hook up, shuffle to the door
Jump right out and count to four
DI - Sound off!
Marchers - 1, 2!
DI - Sound off!
Marchers - 3, 4!
DI - SOUND OFF!
Marchers - 1234, 1,2....3,4!

I wanna be a scuba diver
Swimmin' those oceans wider and wider
Scuba Diver, wider and wider
Airborne Ranger, life of danger

Paramedic, shoot that funky anesthetic
Paramedic, anesthetic

Mountain climber, climb those mountains higher and higher
Mountain climber, higher and higher

Navy Pilot, if it's got wings then I can fly it
Navy pilot, I can fly it

I wanna be an airborne ranger,
Live the life of guts and danger.

Airborne ranger,
Life of danger.

I wanna be a scuba diver,
Swim around in the muddy water.

Scuba diver, muddy water.
Airborne ranger, life of danger.

I wanna be an S.F. medic,
Shoot some funky anesthetic.

S.F.medic, anesthetic.
Scuba diver, muddy water.
Airborne ranger, guts and danger.

And when I retire.

I'm gonna be a Texas ranger,
Drive around in skin-tight wranglers!

Texas ranger, skin-tight wranglers.

I'm gonna be a UPS man,
Drive around in a ugly brown van.

UPS man, ugly brown van
Texas ranger, skin-tight wranglers.

I'm gonna be a forest ranger.
Chipmunks are my greatest danger.

Forest ranger, chipmunk danger.
UPS man, ugly brown van.
Forest ranger, chipmunk danger.

My Drill Instructor (by implication, the singer is in the US Marine Corps)

The Army calls 'em drill sergeants,
The Navy calls 'em RDC's,
The Air Force calls 'em their TI's;
But mine is strictly a DI:
"Drill Instructor," then his rank
Unless you want to play games,
Never "sir" or something more
Or my face is on the floor.

If I called him "Drill Sergeant,"
He'd take me out to the pit.
If I called him a TI,
He'd make me feel like I would die.
If I called him RDC,
He'd make an example out of me.

So make sure you get it right,
Or you'll end up in his sights.

An example of one such call is the first stanza of Yellow Bird:

A yellow bird with a yellow bill
Was sittin' on my window sill
I lured him in with a piece of bread
And then I smashed his little head
(REPEAT)

In the last line, the word 'little' is frequently used to replace profanity. This is an example of the minor tweaks that frequently occur in cadences depending on the particular military unit or installation they are used at. A particular cadence, when used by infantry or other combat arms units may include explicit profanity, while the same cadence, when used by a training or medical unit, or especially if officers are present, may be censored to a degree, as above.

The second verse to the preceding cadence:

The moral of
The story is,
To get some head
You need some bread
{REPEAT}

One from the U.S. Navy:

I wanna be a Navy pilot
I wanna fly an F-14

I wanna fly with the cockpit open
I wanna hear those commies scream

An excerpt from the popular "When I Go to Heaven", also known as "How'd Ya Earn Your Living" or "When I Get to Heaven"

When I go to bars
The girls they will say

How did you earn your living
How did you earn your pay

And my reply was with a cold kind of nod
I earn my living killing commies for my God

When I go home
The hippies they will say

How did you earn your living
How did you earn your pay

And I replied as I pulled out my knife
Get out of my way before I take yo' life

Another, more modern example of a controversial cadence popular through the US Navy:

I don't know, but it's been said
Air Force wings are made of lead

I don't know, but I've been told
Navy wings are made of gold

He-ey Ar-rmy
Ba-ack packing Ar-my
Put on your packs and follow me
I'm in the U.S. Navy

He-ey Air Force
Lo-ow flying Air Force
Get in your planes and follow me
I'm in the U.S. Navy

He-ey Coast Guard
Pud-dle pirate Coast Guard
Get in your boats and follow me
I'm in the U.S. Navy

He-ey Marines
bullet-sponge marine corps
Pick up your rifles and follow me
I'm in the U.S. Navy

The Marine cadence "I Went to the Market" is another vulgar cadence.

I went to the market
Where all the families shop
I pulled out my Ka-bar
And started to chop
To the left right left right left right kill
Left right left right you know I will

I went to the church
Where all the families pray
I pulled out my machine gun
And started to spray
To the left right left right left right kill
Left right left right you know I will

Another closely related is:

 I went to the mall
Where all the ladies shop
I pulled out my Ka-bar
And started to chop
To the left right left right left right kill
Left right left right you know I will

I went to the mosque
Where the Motherfuckers pray
I kicked in the door 
And threw in a grenade

I went to the park
Where the kiddies like to play
I pulled out my SAW
And started to spray
To the left right left right left right kill
Left right left right you know I will

The popular Cold War era jodie "On the Mountain" is also fairly controversial, especially in noncombatant outfits and among cadet groups.

One by one, we loaded our guns on the mountain all day and on through the night.
Two by two, the Commies came through on the mountain all day and on through the night.
Three by three, we shot off their knees on the mountain all day and on through the night.
Four by four, we shot 'em some more on the mountain all day and on through the night.
Five by five, we burned them alive on the mountain all day and on through the night!
Six by six, we beat them with sticks on the mountain all day and on through the night.
Seven by seven, we sent them to Heaven on the mountain all day and on through the night.
Eight by eight, the feeling was great on the mountain all day and on through the night.
Nine by nine, the killing was fine on the mountain all day and on through the night.
Ten by ten, we'll do it again for the mountain all day and on through the night!

Non-military cadences

Police

Police personnel who train in para-military fashion also have acquired the tradition for its recruits in the police academy.
However, the "lyrics" are changed for law enforcement, for example:

A six gun, a tin star, a horse named Blue.
In 1890 a cop held these true.

In 1930 the tommy gun.
It made police work a lot more fun.

A big block Dodge Polara Pursuit.
In sixty six it came out of the chute.

We got night vision on our MP5's.
These are the tools to keep us alive.

In 20 years, who knows what it will be.
Phaser guns mounted on my HumVee.

From a horse named Blue to a big HumVee
We'll still PT in the Academy!
 (Last line yelled)

Fire academy
Fire academies in the U.S. often train in a para-military style. The following is a common cadence heard in the Fire Academy (Originally by the Marines)

When my grand mama was 91
She did PT just for fun

When my grand mama was 92
She did PT better than you

When my grand mama was 93
She did PT better than me

Hoo-rah grand mama
Whatcha doin grand mama

She loves to double time
She does it all the time

Left Left Lefty right-o left right
Left Left keep it in step now

When my grand mama was 94
She did PT more and more

When my grand mama was 95
She did PT to stay alive

When my grand mama was 96
She did PT just for kicks

Hoo-rah grand mama
Whatcha doin grand mama

She loves to double time
She does it all the time

Left Left Lefty right-o left right
Left Left keep it in step now

When my grand mama was 97
She up, she died, she went to heaven

When my grand mama was 98
She meet St. Peter at the Pearly Gate
She said "St. Peter, sorry I'm late"
She went side-straddle hoppin' through the Pearly Gate

When my grand mama was 99
She did PT mighty-fine
She had Ol' J.C. Doublin' Time

See also
 Drum cadence
 March (music)
 Military parade
 Fiddler's Green

References

Bibliography
 "ADA cadence calls." 1988. Source: Air Defense Artillery. May–June, 1988, pp. 33–40.
 Casey, Ryan. 2002. Cadences of the U.S. Marine Corps. San Diego, CA: Documentary Recordings. "Cadence calling directions; U.S. Marine Corps running cadences; Recon Marines; U.S. Marine Corps pride; Service rivalries; U.S. Marine drill instructors; Humorous cadences; From WWII to the War on Terror; 'Shorties'; U.S. Marine Corps marching cadences." ; 9780972428101.
 Deutsche Bundeswehr. 2008. German Army morning running cadence. "This is our own style and not a copy. Running cadences have to be faster than marching cadences. When marching, we're chanting "Infanterie, du bist die Krone aller Waffen", "Hätt ich nur eine Krone", "Grün ist unser Fallschirm", "Oh du schöner Westerwald", "Grüne Teufel" etc. Every branch has their own traditional cadences."
 Dunnigan, Timothy P. 1997. Modern military cadence. Alexandria, Va: Byrd Enterprises.
 Engstrom, John, and P. C. Butler. 1987. Count cadence count. Fallbrook, Calif: Best Military Publications.
 Frary, Joel. 2006. Army cadences. "Frary discusses the origin and importance of cadences in both a historical and moral context. Also, a brief background of the purposes of cadences, including their emotional, artistic and traditional attributes are discussed."
 Jody calls, armor cavalry. 1976. [Fort Knox, Ky.?]: Army. "Armor cavalry jody calls".
 Johnson, Sandee Shaffer. 1900. Cadences: the Jody call book. Canton, Ohio: Daring Press. ; 9780938936114.
 United States Army Infantry Center. 1984. Jody calls. Ft. Benning, Ga: The Center.

External links
 The Cadence Page
 MP3s of cadences
 more background on the Duckworth cadence
 Link to mp3 and a full text of the Jody Cadence
 Special Operations.com Cadence Database
 Military Cadence Calls, Military Songs and Jody Calls Forum

American folklore
Folk songs
Military traditions
Military slang and jargon
Military music
Articles containing video clips